Partickhill railway station was a railway station serving the Partick area of Glasgow. The station was opened by the North British Railway Company in 1874 on the north side of Dumbarton Road. At some periods during its existence it was described as Partick for Govan in some timetables.

History
It was at one stage, one of three stations in Partick, along with the Central and West stations, but was the only one of the three stations to be spared in the Beeching cuts of the mid-1960s, having been extensively rebuilt in 1958.

The station closed in 1979, when the Greater Glasgow Passenger Transport Executive were reopening the Argyle Line (itself a victim of the Beeching axe), they decided to open a new Partick railway station on the same site as Merkland Street subway station, which was itself undergoing refurbishment as part of the overall upgrade of the Glasgow Subway that was undertaken in the late 1970s. With this new Partick station, which worked as an interchange with bus and subway services being separated by only a bridge over Dumbarton Road from the site of the Partickhill station it was decided that the Partickhill site was now redundant and the station closed.

Much of its structures are still visible to the present day, including the platforms.

Services

References

Notes

Sources

External links
Video footage of Partickhill and Partick Stations

Disused railway stations in Glasgow
Former North British Railway stations
Railway stations in Great Britain opened in 1874
Railway stations in Great Britain closed in 1979
Partick